Dibenzothiepins are chemical compounds which are derivatives of thiepin with two benzene (here called benzo) rings.

References